Wofford College is a private liberal arts college in Spartanburg, South Carolina. It was founded in 1854. The  campus is a national arboretum and one of the few four-year institutions in the southeastern United States founded before the American Civil War that still operates on its original campus.

Wofford was founded with a bequest of $100,000 from the Rev. Benjamin Wofford (1780–1850), a Methodist minister and Spartanburg native who sought to create a college for "literary, classical, and scientific education in my native district of Spartanburg." The college's Main Building is the oldest structure on campus and was designed by the noted Charleston architect Edward C. Jones. In 1941, the college was awarded a chapter of Phi Beta Kappa, the nation's oldest academic honor society, and the Beta of South Carolina chapter was the first at a private college in South Carolina.

The academic year consists of a four-month fall semester, a one-month January term called the Interim, and a four-month spring semester. The college is listed on the President's Community Service Honor Roll and in the annual Open Doors" report for providing studies abroad opportunities for its students.

Wofford College Historic District

The Wofford College Historic District consists of the Main Building, which was designed by Edward C. Jones in the Italianate style, and six two-story brick residences. It was named to the National Register of Historic Places in 1974. The Wofford campus has been landscaped, developed, and designated as a national arboretum.

Construction of the Main Building began in 1852 and the first classes were held in the fall of 1854. During the Civil War, the endowment was invested in Confederate bonds and other securities, which became worthless by the end of the war.

Endowment
In February 2021, Jerry Richardson, alumnus and founding owner of Carolina Panthers, donated $150 million to the college's endowment, which exceeds $400 million. This is the largest gift in Wofford's history and with it Richardson's donations for all purposes have exceeded $260 million over his lifetime. This gift is intended for need-based financial scholarships and experiences for Wofford students.

Rankings
Wofford is ranked 69th in U.S. News & World Reports list of the best national liberal arts colleges, a ranking that has improved in the last 10 years. In 2010, Forbes ranked it 58th on its inaugural Forbes List of America's 650 Best Colleges. In 2018 Forbes also named Wofford the number one four-year college in South Carolina.

Academics
The academic year consists of a four-month fall semester, a one-month January term called the Interim, and a four-month spring semester.

Faculty
136 full-time faculty teach at the college, 92 percent of whom have earned a doctorate or equivalent terminal degree. The FTE faculty to student ratio is 1:11.

Majors and minors
Wofford offers academic majors in a variety of areas including 27 majors.

The college also offers pre-professional programs in Teacher Education (secondary certification), Dentistry, Medicine, Law, Ministry, Engineering, and Veterinary Science. The college's Army ROTC program was established in 1919.

Interim program
The Interim program is designed to provide students with opportunities to gain new experiences outside the realm of traditional academics and allows students to become involved in departments outside their academic majors. Interims generally fall into one of four categories. In the most common type, students enroll in faculty-proposed projects on campus. These projects range from participation in theatre to pottery, knitting and short story writing. Students may elect to enroll in internship projects that are supervised by faculty, but involve working off-campus in legal, medical, dental, congressional, corporate, or non-profit settings. Students may propose independent research projects under the supervision of a faculty sponsor. Finally, faculty-led travel projects take groups of students and professors to study in other parts of the United States or in Europe, Asia, Africa, South America, or Australia. Recent travel projects have included study in England and Ireland, South Africa, Peru, Brazil, Belize, Vietnam, China, and Japan.

International programs
The college's Office of International Programs helps students select from over 200 study abroad programs in 59 countries. Wofford consistently ranks in the nation's top ten in the Institute of International Education Open Doors Survey, which is based on comparing the number of students earning credits abroad in a given year the number of students in the graduating class. Wofford's 2009 score was 93%, compared to the Lincoln Commission national average of 9% of graduates earning credits abroad. The college has had six Fulbright English Teaching assistantships in the past four years as well as two Rotary Ambassadorial Scholarships. In 2012, Rachel Woodlee was selected as Wofford's sixth Rhodes Scholar.

Athletics

The Wofford Terriers compete in NCAA Division I in the Southern Conference. Wofford's colors are old gold and black. The school mascot is the Terrier. In the 2010 NCAA Division I graduation success report, 9 of 13 Wofford teams posted GRS scores of 100, the highest available mark. For the past 16 years, the Carolina Panthers have made their summer training camp home at Wofford. The Shrine Bowl of the Carolinas (a high school all-star football game) is played at Wofford's Gibbs Stadium. Boss, a Boston Terrier,  is the mascot for Wofford Athletics.

Wofford is represented by 18 men and women's varsity sports. Gibbs Stadium, opened in 1996, is the home field for Terrier football games. The baseball team, 2022 regular season conference champions, plays its home games at Russell C. King Field. Men's and women's basketball and volleyball teams play in the Benjamin Johnson Arena of the Campus Life Building, opened in 1981. The inaugural men's basketball game was played in 3300-seat Jerry Richardson Indoor Stadium on 10 November 2017. Soccer teams play on Snyder Field, which was the college's football stadium through 1995. Wofford men's basketball has won the Southern Conference Championship and an NCAA bid five times since 2010, and in 2018/19 went a perfect 21–0 in Southern Conference play and won an NCAA tournament game for the first time. Wofford football won the SoCon championship in 2017, 2018, and 2019.

Student life
Wofford offers a self-contained environment (93% of students live on campus). The Village apartment-style housing for the senior class was a 2008 "Dorm of Distinction" as chosen by University Business Magazine. Phase V of The Village, an $11 million project, opened in the fall of 2011. It added 80 beds in loft apartments, bringing the capacity of The Village to 428 students. It also houses The Space in the Mungo Center (formerly The Center for Professional Excellence), specialized classroom spaces, and a dining and market area called the "Grand Galleria."

Student organizations
Students participate in various service, pre-professional, religious, social, and other student organizations. Student publications at the college date to the first literary magazine, first published in 1889. The student newspaper, the Old Gold and Black, is published every other week, and the yearbook, The Bohemian, is published each spring. Delta Phi Alpha, the national collegiate German honorary society, was founded at Wofford, as was the National Beta Club, an honorary society prominent in American high schools.

In 1941, the college was awarded a chapter of Phi Beta Kappa, the nation's oldest academic honor society. This was the first chapter at a private college in South Carolina.

Service learning
Wofford has a variety of student service organizations on campus, including the Bonner Scholars, Twin Towers, Alpha Phi Omega service fraternity, and ONE.

Wofford was included in the 2010 President's Higher Education Community Service Honor Roll, published by the Corporation for National and Community Service. Washington Monthly compared 23 of 252 Top Liberal Arts Colleges contributions to the public good in three broad categories: Social Mobility (recruiting and graduating low-income students), Research (producing cutting-edge scholarship and PhDs), and Service (encouraging students to give something back to their country). In the magazine's 2010 ratings, Wofford finished 23rd among 252 Top Liberal Arts Colleges and was number 1 in South Carolina. Newsweek identified Wofford as one of the most "service-minded" campuses in the country, ranking the college second in listings released in September 2010. Six recent Wofford graduates have been selected for the Teach For America Corps.

Student government
The student government rests in the Campus Union, with executive officers and an assembly elected by the student body. Students serve on various campus committees and represent the student body before various committees of the board of trustees.

Student conduct is governed by the Code of Student Rights and Responsibilities, a document written by an Interim project in 1970–1971. The code is enforced by a judicial commission consisting of elected and appointed members. An honor council enforces the student honor code in academic matters.

Fraternities and sororities
The college recognizes 14 chapters of national fraternities and sororities, with 42 percent of men and 53 percent of women participating.

Fraternities include Sigma Alpha Epsilon, Kappa Alpha Order, Kappa Sigma, Pi Kappa Phi, Pi Kappa Alpha, Sigma Nu, and Kappa Alpha Psi.

The sororities include Delta Delta Delta, Kappa Alpha Theta, Kappa Delta, and Zeta Tau Alpha.

Diversity
In each of the years from 1901 through 1904, two women graduated from Wofford. In 1964, Wofford became the first private college in South Carolina to desegregate voluntarily with the admission of Albert Gray.

Alumni

Academia 

 Paige West, Columbia University and Barnard College anthropologist, 2021 Guggenheim Fellow

Athletics 
 Brenton Bersin, former NFL wide receiver
 Fisher DeBerry, retired head football coach and an inductee into the Columbus Football Hall of Fame
 Robert Galloway, Professional tennis player. Career high doubles ranking of 82 on the ATP tour.
 Eric Garcia, basketball player for the Kataja BC of the Korisliiga
 Forrest Lasso, soccer player for the FC Cincinnati in USL Pro
 Brad Loesing, American-German basketball player for the team s.Oliver Würzburg in the Basketball Bundesliga (BBL)
 Fletcher Magee, basketball player, NCAA shooting record holder
 William McGirt, professional golfer on the PGA Tour
 Danny Morrison, President of the Carolina Panthers NFL football teams
 Ameet Pall, former defensive end who played in the Canadian Football League
 Kasey Redfern, free agent punter in the NFL
 Jerry Richardson, founder of the Carolina Panthers, former wide receiver for the Baltimore Colts
 Nate Woody, defensive coordinator for the Army Black Knights

Business
 George Dean Johnson, Jr., Founder of Extended Stay America and Advance America Cash Advance. President of Johnson Development Authority, Spartanburg, SC
 Jerry Richardson, Founder of Hardee's and was the founding owner of the Carolina Panthers NFL franchise. He owned the team for 23 years.
 Jude Reyes, billionaire co-chairman (with his brother J. Christopher Reyes) of Reyes Holdings

Entertainment
 Craig Melvin, anchor and correspondent for MSNBC and NBC News
 Wendi Nix, anchor and reporter for ESPN
 Ellison Barber, American journalist and correspondent for NBC News

Politics, law, and public service
 Paul S. Atkins, former commissioner of the U.S. Securities and Exchange Commission
 Ibra C. Blackwood, governor of South Carolina (1931–1935)
 Adam Bowling, member of the Kentucky House of Representatives
 Michael J. Copps, former commissioner of the Federal Communications Commission
 Samuel Dibble, a member of the U.S. House of Representatives and the first graduate of Wofford College (Class of 1856)
 Henry F. Floyd, judge on the United States Court of Appeals for the Fourth Circuit
 Donald Fowler, former chairman of the Democratic National Committee
 Clyde H. Hamilton, judge of the U.S. Court of Appeals for the Fourth Circuit
 Joseph C. Hutchinson, lieutenant general in the Florida National Guard and Chairman of the Seminole County Commission in 1960-1964
 Olin D. Johnston, former United States senator, South Carolina (1945–1965); governor of South Carolina (1935–1939, 1943–1945)
 C. Bruce Littlejohn, associate justice South Carolina Supreme Court (1966–1984); chief justice (1984–1985)
 Thomas Gordon McLeod, governor of South Carolina (1923–1927)
 Costa M. Pleicones, associate justice, later chief justice, of the South Carolina Supreme Court since 2000
 Dennis W. Shedd, judge on the U. S. Court of Appeals for the Fourth Circuit
 Ellison D. Smith, former United States senator, South Carolina (1909–1945: 17th longest-serving senator in history)
 John G. Stabler, associate justice South Carolina Supreme Court (1926–1935); chief justice (1935–1940)
 Charles Albert Woods, associate justice South Carolina Supreme Court (1903–1913); judge on the U. S. Court of Appeals for the Fourth Circuit (1913–1925)

Religion
William H. Willimon, author, Duke University chaplain, minister, and retired Bishop of the United Methodist Church, North Alabama Conference

Education
 William Preston Few, first and longest serving president of Duke University and the fifth and last president of its predecessor, Trinity College
 James Kirkland, second and longest-serving chancellor of Vanderbilt University
 James A. Knight, psychiatrist, theologian, and medical ethicist; first dean of the Texas A&M School of Medicine

Religion
 William Wallace Duncan (Class of 1858), Bishop of the Methodist Episcopal Church, South
 Francis L. Garrett, chief of chaplains of the U.S. Navy
 Marion J. Hatchett, a liturgical scholar in the Episcopal Church who helped to shape the 1979 Book of Common Prayer
 Albert C. Outler, theologian and philosopher

Gallery

References

External links

 

 
Buildings and structures in Spartanburg, South Carolina
Education in Spartanburg County, South Carolina
Educational institutions established in 1854
Universities and colleges accredited by the Southern Association of Colleges and Schools
Private universities and colleges in South Carolina
University and college buildings on the National Register of Historic Places in South Carolina
National Register of Historic Places in Spartanburg, South Carolina
Historic districts on the National Register of Historic Places in South Carolina
1854 establishments in South Carolina